The 2016 season was Haugesund's 7th season in the Tippeligaen following their promotion in 2009.

Season Review
Haugesund started the season under the management of Mark Dempsey. Dempsey resigned as manager on 14 July 2016.

Squad

Out on loan

Transfers

Winter

In:

Out:

Summer

In:

Out:

Competitions

Tippeligaen

Results summary

Results by round

Results

Table

Norwegian Cup

Squad statistics

Appearances and goals

|-
|colspan="14"|Players away from Haugesund on loan:

|-
|colspan="14"|Players who appeared for Haugesund no longer at the club:

|}

Goal scorers

Disciplinary record

References

FK Haugesund seasons
Haugesund